The 2015 IAAF World Cross Country Championships was the 41st edition of the global championships in cross country running, organised by the International Association of Athletics Federations. It was held in Guiyang, China on 28 March. It was the first time that the event was held in China, and the third occasion it took place in Asia (after Fukuoka in 2006, and Amman in 2009). Senior and junior races were held for men and women, with the four races having both a team and individual element.

Overview
The senior individual titles were won by Kenyan athletes. Geoffrey Kipsang, a former junior champion and reigning world half marathon champion, took the men's title by a margin of eight seconds. The 19-year-old Agnes Jebet Tirop was the women's champion, establishing herself as a senior athlete for the first time after her runner-up finish in the junior race at the 2013 edition. This made her the second youngest ever winner of that title, after Zola Budd in 1985. Aside from these victories, it was Ethiopia that had the most success: Yasin Haji and Letesenbet Gidey were crowned the junior champions while the Ethiopian teams won the senior titles and had a clean sweep in the women's junior race. Bahrain was the only non-East African nation to win a medal, albeit with teams of entirely African expatriates.

The host choice reflected the increasing prominence of China in the world of athletics. Having only staged one major IAAF event before 2006, the country quickly rose to host the 2006 World Junior Championships, the 2008 Olympic athletics, 2010 World Half Marathon Championships, and 2014 IAAF World Race Walking Cup. The cross country event preceded Beijing's holding of the 2015 World Championships in Athletics later that year.

The course for the competition was a former horse racing course around 30 km from the city centre, which had hosted the Asian Cross Country Championships in 2005 as well as ten editions of the Chinese Cross Country Championships. In addition to the main competition, mass participation races over 2 km and 4 km were held in the morning before the official opening ceremony, aimed at improving public engagement in the sport.

Preparation
In the year before the competition, the Guiyang International Half Marathon was inaugurated, increasing local running participation. This added to the history of athletics in the region, which included a long-running Guiyang road race in its 44th edition that year. The 2015 Chinese national championships a month before the global event were not contested at the same course, instead being held in Qujing. Zhang Xinyan won both the women's long and short course titles, while Zhu Renxue and Wang Ligang won the men's long and short races, respectively.

Schedule
All four races were held in the afternoon in the usual traditional, with junior races preceding the senior races, and the senior men's event concluding the programme.

Medallists

Results

Senior men's race

111 entrants, 110 starters, 108 finishers.

Note: Athletes in parentheses did not score for the team result.

Senior women's race

83 entrants, 82 starters, 80 finishers.

Note: Athletes in parentheses did not score for the team result.

Junior men's race

118 entrants, 118 starters, 113 finishers.

Note: Athletes in parentheses did not score for the team result.

Junior women's race

101 entrants, 100 starters, 87 finishers.

Note: Athletes in parentheses did not score for the team result.

Medal table 

Note: Totals include both individual and team medals, with medals in the team competition counting as one medal.

Participation
A total of 410 athletes from 51 countries participated, excluding non-starters. This represented an increase of ten nations from the previous edition and thirteen additional participating athletes in total.

References

External links
Official website
IAAF competition website

 
2015
International athletics competitions hosted by China
World Cross Country Championships
World Cross Country Championships
Guiyang
Sport in Guizhou
Cross country running in China
March 2015 sports events in China